The Ministry of Oil and Mineral Resources is a department of the Council of Ministers of the Syrian Arab Republic. It is led by the Minister of Oil.

History 
In 2020, United States sanctions were placed on the ministry.

Responsibilities 
Identified the functions and competencies of the Ministry of Petroleum and Mineral recourses under Legislative Decree No. 121 of 1970 and Act No. 45 6/30/2001 so as to become its terms of reference are the following:

1.Supervision of the institutions and enterprises of the ministry.

2.The supervision of the Prospecting production and investment efficiently managed if productivity was oil and mineral resources.

3.The policy of all aspects of the activity on the oil, gas and mineral resources.

4.Supervision of the implementation of development projects and the activity related with both oil and mineral resources.

5.Adoption of the development plans of institutions and companies of the ministry, that continued their implementation.

6.Prepare studies and plans which the process of development required and modernization of the ministry and with a view to keeping pace with The developments oil industry and mineral resources in the world.

7.Coordination among the institutions, and enterprises of the ministry, and work to resolve all differences.

8.Working to secure funding for its projects productivity and investment cooperation with the concerned authorities.

Institutions and companies affiliated with the Ministry 

 General Oil Corporation

 Syrian Petroleum Company

 Syrian Gas Company

 Syrian Company for Oil Transport

 Al Furat Oil Company

 Deir Ezzor Oil Company

 Kawkab Oil Company

 Hayyan Oil Company

 Ebla Oil Company

 Degla Oil Company

 Al-Rasheed Oil Company

 General Corporation for Oil Refining and Distribution of Petroleum Derivatives

 State Company for Homs Refinery

 State Company for Baniyas Refinery

 General Corporation of Geology and Mineral Resources

 The General Company for Phosphates and Mines

 National Seismic Center

 Institute of Petroleum and Mineral Professions

Ministers of Oil

See also 
 Petroleum industry in Syria
 Ministry of Petroleum

References 

Energy in Syria
Ministries established in 1966
1966 establishments in Syria
Energy ministries
Mining ministries
Government ministries of Syria